Seth Stubblefield (born July 21, 1993) is an American retired competitive swimmer who specialized in sprint freestyle and butterfly. He is a gold medalist in the 4×100-meter freestyle relay from the 2015 World University Games in Gwangju.

Early life
Stubblefield was the 2010 Junior National champion in both the 100 and 200-meter butterfly, which qualified him for the 2010 Junior Pan Pacific Championships in Maui, Hawaii. At Junior Pan Pacs, Stubblefield earned a silver medal in the 200-meter butterfly and a gold medal in the 4×100-meter freestyle relay.

Swimming as a sophomore for Plano Senior High School at the 2009 5A Texas State Championships, Stubblefield won the 4×50 and the 4×100 y freestyle relays. As a junior at the 2010 State Championships, he won the 4×100 freestyle relay and was runner-up in the 50 y freestyle and the 100 y butterfly. In the 4×50 y medley relay, Stubblefield teamed up with high school and club teammate Will Licon to earn a bronze medal. In his senior year, he elected to forego his last year of high school eligibility. He still currently holds the Plano Senior High School records in the 200-yard freestyle relay, 200-yard medley relay, and the 400-yard freestyle relay.

Collegiate career
Stubblefield competed for the California Golden Bears from 2011-2015 where he was a 3-time NCAA champion, 5-time NCAA runner-up, 2-time NCAA team champion (2012 & 2014), 16-time All-American, and a 5-time honorable mention All-American. He also formerly held the American record in the 4×100 medley relay from the 2015 NCAA Championships.

International career
At the 2014 Phillips 66 Summer National Championships, Stubblefield swam the 50 and 100-meter freestyles as well as the 100-meter butterfly. Stubblefield's times in the 50 and 100 freestyles qualified himself for the 2015 World University Games in Gwangju, where he won a gold medal in the 4×100 m freestyle relay.

At the 2016 U.S. Olympic Trials, Stubblefield entered the 100-meter butterfly final as the top-seeded swimmer, ahead of the likes of Michael Phelps and Tom Shields. In a tightly-contested race, Stubblefield touched third behind Phelps and Shields, missing out on an Olympic berth by 4-hundredths of a second.

Personal life
Seth is married to former University of Georgia All-American swimmer Lauren (Harrington) Stubblefield, and they have a son together named Judah. Seth is the son of Scott and Patti Stubblefield and has a younger sister, Alyssa.

Personal bests

See also
 NCAA Division I Men's Swimming and Diving Championships
 California Golden Bears
 List of University of California, Berkeley alumni in sports

References

External links
  at Team USA
  at SwimSwam
  at Swimcloud

1993 births
Living people
American male butterfly swimmers
American male freestyle swimmers
Universiade medalists in swimming
Universiade gold medalists for the United States
Medalists at the 2015 Summer Universiade
California Golden Bears men's swimmers
Sportspeople from Plano, Texas
People from San Angelo, Texas
20th-century American people
21st-century American people